Gajg-e Poshtkuh (also Romanized as Gajg-e Poshtkūh and Gojg-e Poshtkūh; also known as Govājag-e Pāpar) is a village in Shamil Rural District, Takht District, Bandar Abbas County, Hormozgan Province, Iran. At the 2006 census, its population was 153, in 39 families.

References 

Populated places in Bandar Abbas County